TV+ or TV plus may refer to:
ABC TV Plus, an Australian television channel
TV+ (Bulgaria), a Bulgarian television channel
TV+ (Chile), formerly UCV, a Chilean free-to-air television channel
TV Plus, a local television station in Kumanovo, North Macedonia
ABS-CBN TV Plus, formerly Sky TV+, a Philippine digital terrestrial television provider
Apple TV+, an over-the-top subscription video on-demand service
E TV Plus, an Indian Telugu comedy entertainment channel
Jan TV Plus, an Indian satellite television channel
Samsung TV Plus, an over-the-top video service

See also
TV Puls, a Polish commercial television channel